Harpending is a surname. Notable people with the surname include:

Abraham V. Harpending (1816–1871), American lawyer and politician
Asbury Harpending (1839–1923), American adventurer and financier
Henry Harpending (1944–2016), American anthropologist and professor